Andrei Cristea (born 15 May 1984) is a Romanian professional footballer who plays as a forward. Although deployed as a forward, Cristea is better known for his pace and his range of passing instead of his goalscoring abilities, and represented the Romania national team from 2003 to 2010.

Club career
Cristea started football in his home town and made his debut in the Divizia A in 2001, for local club FCM Bacău.

In the summer of 2004, Cristea transferred to Steaua București for a fee of $1 million. However, he did not manage to earn a first-team place there, despite scoring two goals that eliminated Valencia CF in the 2004–05 UEFA Cup season. He was put on the transfer list in the summer of 2006.

Cristea moved to fellow Liga I club Politehnica Timişoara, in a swap which saw Gigel Coman move to Steaua București. After failing to impress at Politehnica Timişoara, he was loaned to Politehnica Iaşi for the second part of the 2007–08 season, where he had a great part in saving the team from relegation, with man of the match performances against CFR Cluj and his former team, Steaua București.

Dinamo București
On 9 May 2008, Cristea signed a five-year contract with Dinamo, just six days before turning 24. He called the transfer "a birthday present" and joined Dinamo after the summer holiday. He started scoring for the red and white team in the friendly games they played in pre-season. Cristea played only the first half on the season for Dinamo, netting two goals in eight matches and entering Dinamo's history by scoring the goal that brought the 1.000th victory of the team in all-time domestic championship, against Farul Constanta.

Cristea again went on loan to Politehnica Iași, in the winter transfer window, where he was very well received and scored seven times in 15 games, goals which proved crucial in helping the team continue in the first division. Upon his return, he became a very important player, scoring goals that brought significant victories in Liga I and Europa League. He was the top scorer of the Romanian league in the 2009–10 season with 16 goals.

Karlsruhe
On 16 January 2011, Karlsruhe signed Cristea in the attempt of avoiding the relegation. On 13 February, Cristea scored two goals against the leader of Second Bundesliga, Hertha BSC. These were his first goals on this new club. On 27 February, he scored the last goal of the game in the 1–4 loss against FC Ingolstadt 04, after coming from bench. On 11 March, Cristea scored the first goal of the match in Karlsruhe-Duisburg, 3–1 final score. On 15 May, in the last round of the Second Bundesliga, the Romanian striker saved his club from relegation, scoring a brace in the 3–2 win against Union Berlin. The next season Karlsruhe were relegated after a play-off and Cristea became a free agent.

Initially, Cristea wanted to stay in Germany, where he had offers from Ingolstadt and Energie Cottbus, but Dinamo approached him and he accepted to return to Bucharest where he had the chance to again work under Dario Bonetti. On 22 June 2014, Cristea signed a one-year contract with Azerbaijan Premier League side Gabala FK. In December of the same year Cristea had his contract with Gabala terminated. Following his release he signed with Lega Pro side U.S. Salernitana 1919 until the end of the season.

Politehnica Iași
After playing for Salernitana and Martina Franca in the Italian Serie C, in February 2016, Cristea returned to Romania to join his former team, Liga I club Politehnica Iași. He subsequently signed a one and a half-year contract with the Moldavian squad.

He scored 7 goals in 17 games in the second half of the 2015–16 Liga I and helped Politehnica Iași qualify for the 2016–17 Europa League qualifying phase for the first time in their history. He then opened the scoring in a 2–2 draw against Hajduk Split in their first European game. On 14 December 2018, in a game against Concordia Chiajna, Cristea scored a brace and reached 100 goals scored in the Romanian Liga I.

On 27 September 2020, Cristea scored a hat-trick in a 5–2 league win over FCSB.

International career
Cristea made his debut for the Romania national team on 11 October 2003, in a 1–1 draw against Japan. Over the years he made ten appearances for the national team, until his retirement in 2010.

Career statistics

Club

International

Honours

Club
Steaua București
Divizia A: 2004–05, 2005–06

Dinamo București
Supercupa României: 2012

US Salernitana
Serie C: 2014–15

Individual
Liga I top scorer: 2009–10

References

External links

1984 births
Living people
Sportspeople from Bacău
Romanian footballers
Association football forwards
Liga I players
FC Steaua București players
FCM Bacău players
FC Politehnica Timișoara players
FC Politehnica Iași (1945) players
FC Dinamo București players
2. Bundesliga players
Karlsruher SC players
FC Brașov (1936) players
Gabala FC players
U.S. Salernitana 1919 players
FC Politehnica Iași (2010) players
CS Universitatea Craiova players
CS Mioveni players
Romanian expatriate footballers
Expatriate footballers in Germany
Romanian expatriate sportspeople in Germany
Expatriate footballers in Azerbaijan
Romanian expatriate sportspeople in Azerbaijan
Expatriate footballers in Italy
Romanian expatriate sportspeople in Italy
Romania international footballers